Kartika Airlines was an airline based in Jakarta, Indonesia. It operated domestic services from Jakarta. Its main base was Soekarno-Hatta International Airport, Jakarta. Kartika Airlines is listed in category 2 by Indonesian Civil Aviation Authority for airline safety quality.

History 

The airline was established in 2001 and started operations on 15 May 2001. It is wholly owned by PT Truba. The airline was grounded in November 2004 and resumed services on 15 June 2005, before finally ceasing operations in 2010. Kartika Airlines was among the Indonesian carriers blacklisted by the European Union Civil Aviation Authority.

Destinations 

 Jakarta – Halim Perdanakusuma Airport Hub
 Jakarta – Soekarno-Hatta International Airport
 Medan – Polonia Airport
 Palembang – Sultan Mahmud Badaruddin II Airport
 Semarang - Semarang Airport
 Yogyakarta – Adisutjipto International Airport
 Pangkalan Bun – Iskandar Airport
Padang – Minangkabau International Airport

Terminated destinations
Asia

 – Padang, Denpasar, Tarakan, Manado, Makassar, Banjarmasin, Balikpapan, Ternate, Semarang, Surabaya, Pontianak, Palangkaraya
 –  Penang, Kuala Lumpur, Ipoh, Johor Bahru
 – Hong Kong

 – Taipei

Fleet 
The Kartika Airlines fleet included the following aircraft:

References

External links 

 

Defunct airlines of Indonesia
Airlines established in 2001
Airlines disestablished in 2010
Indonesian companies established in 2001
2010 disestablishments in Indonesia